Mubi (also known as Moubi) is an Afro-Asiatic language spoken in central Chad. It forms one of the Mubi languages, a group of East Chadic languages.

Mubi speakers comprise the majority of the population of Mangalmé Department.

Notes

References 
 Doornbos, Paul, and M. Lionel Bender. 1983. Languages of Wadai-Darfur. In: M. Lionel Bender (ed.),Nilo-Saharan Language Studies, 43–79. African Studies Center, Michigan State University.
 Johnson, Eric, and Calvain Mbernodji. 2006. Enquête sociolinguistique de la langue Moubi du Tchad. SIL Electronic Survey Reports 2006–003. Dallas: SIL International. Online. URL: https://sil.org/silesr/abstract.asp?ref=2006-003.
 Jungraithmayr, Herrmann. 1968. The Hamitosemitic Present-Habitative verb stem in Ron and Mubi. Journal of West African Languages 5:71–76.
 Jungraithmayr, Herrmann. 1978. Ablaut und Ton im Verbalsystem des Mubi. Afrika und Übersee 61:312–320.
 Jungraithmayr, Herrmann. 1987. La formation de classes verbales en mokilko et en mubi. In: Herrmann Jungraithmayr and Henry Tourneux (eds.), Etudes tchadiques, Classes et extensions verbales. Paris: Geuthner.
 Jungraithmayr, Herrmann. 1991. Essai sur la subordination en Bidiya et en Mubi. In: Herrmann Jungraithmayr and Henry Tourneux (eds.), Études tchadiques: la phrase complexe, 9–13. Paris: Geuthner.
 Jungraithmayr, Herrmann. 2005. Prefix and suffix conjugation in Chadic. In: Pelio Fronzaroli and Paolo Marrassini (eds.), Proceedings of the 10th Meeting of Hamito-Semitic (Afroasiatic) Linguistics, 411–419. Florence: Dipartimento di Linguistica, Università di Firenze.
 Jungraithmayr, Herrmann . 2013. La langue mubi (République du Tchad). Précis de Grammaire – Textes – Lexique (Sprache und Oralität in Afrika, Volume 27).  226 p., Dietrich Reimer Verlag, Berlin, .
 Newman, Paul. 1977b. The formation of the imperfective verb stem in Chadic. Afrika und Übersee 60:178–192.
 Tacáks, Gábor. 2009b. Mubi-Toram lexicon in Chadic and Afro-Asiatic perspective I: Lexemes with initial *B-. Acta Orientalia. 62/3. 315–350.
 Wolff, H. Ekkehard. 1988. “Ablaut” and accent in Chadic. In: Siegmund Brauner and Ekkehard Wolff(eds.), Progressive Traditions in African and Oriental Studies, 165–179.

East Chadic languages
Languages of Chad